Fernando Verdasco was the defending champion, but chose not to participate that year.

Nikolay Davydenko won in the final 6-3, 6-0 against Juan Carlos Ferrero.

Seeds

Main draw

Finals

Top half

Bottom half

External links
 Main Draw
 Qualifying Draw

Singles